Mexico station is a historic railway depot located at Mexico in Oswego County, New York.  It was built in 1905 by the Oswego and Rome Railroad.  It is a one-story, Stick style, wood-frame building, 40 feet by 100 feet in size.  It has a broad hip roof with a wide overhang.  Also on the property is a two stall privy.  It was last used as a railroad depot in 1940.

It was listed on the National Register of Historic Places in 2002 as Mexico Railroad Depot.

References

Railway stations on the National Register of Historic Places in New York (state)
Railway stations in the United States opened in 1866
Railway stations closed in 1958
Transportation buildings and structures in Oswego County, New York
Victorian architecture in New York (state)
Former New York Central Railroad stations
National Register of Historic Places in Oswego County, New York
Former railway stations in New York (state)